Midex Airlines was a cargo airline based in the United Arab Emirates. Licensed for both cargo and passenger services in 2007, the airline concentrated on scheduled cargo services. Passenger service never started. Scheduled cargo service had been operated from Al Ain to Paris ORY for few months, and subsequently closed due to lack of freight.

Midex ended operations in 2015.

Destinations 
Midex Airlines ran an ADHOC Cargo operation, mostly operating from Sharjah International Airport. Usual destinations included until May 2012:
 Bagram AF Base, Kabul and Kandahar in Afghanistan (A300 and 747)
 Karachi, Islamabad, Sialkot and Lahore in Pakistan (A300 and 747)
 Yekaterinburg in Russia (A300)
 Bergamo in Italia (A300)
 Dubai, Abu Dhabi and Fujairah in the United Arab Emirates (A300 and 747)
 Sana'a, Yemen (A300)
 Shanghai, China (747)
 Rio de Janeiro, Brasil (747)
 Amsterdam, The Netherlands (747)
 Frankfurt Hahn, Germany (747)
 Ankara, Turkey (747)
 Minsk, Belarus (747)

From June 2012, the only destination left was Kabul, which was served with a B747.

Fleet 
The Midex Airlines fleet includes (as of May 2012):

References

External links 
http://theloadstar.co.uk/all-cargo-midex-airlines-folds-its-wings-while-court-backs-martinair-restructure/

 
 Midex Airlines Fleet

http://theloadstar.co.uk/all-cargo-midex-airlines-folds-its-wings-while-court-backs-martinair-restructure/

Defunct airlines of the United Arab Emirates
Airlines established in 2007
Defunct cargo airlines
Airlines disestablished in 2015
2015 disestablishments in the United Arab Emirates
Cargo airlines of the United Arab Emirates
Emirati companies established in 2007